Plotting Hitler's Death: The German Resistance To Hitler, 1933–1945 is a 1994 book by the historian Joachim Fest about the Germans, both civilian and military, who plotted to kill Adolf Hitler from 1933 onwards. It was written to mark the 50th anniversary of the 20 July plot to kill Hitler and translated into English in 1996. The book includes detailed accounts of various plots and explores the reasons the Allies and many within Germany gave little support to the resistance to Hitler. Among those treated extensively in the book are Colonel Henning von Tresckow and, later, Lieutenant Colonel Claus Schenk Graf von Stauffenberg.

See also
 List of books by or about Adolf Hitler

Books about Adolf Hitler
Books by Joachim Fest
History books about World War II
Books about Nazism
German resistance to Nazism
1994 non-fiction books